The 2016–17 VTB United League was the 8th complete season of the VTB United League. It is also the fourth season that the league functions as the Russian domestic first tier level. CSKA Moscow was the defending champion and successfully defended its title. This season, 13 teams participated in the league after four sides from the previous year left.

Teams
VITA Tbilisi, Bisons Loimaa, ČEZ Nymburk left the league, after participating in the 2015–16 season. Parma Perm from the Russian Basketball Super League joined the league. 

On August 30, 2016, the league announced that BC Krasny Oktyabr would not play in the league, because the host arena of the team was not approved to support events.

Because of these changes, the number of teams was reduced to 13.

Venues and locations 

{| class="wikitable sortable"
|-
! Team
! Home City
! Arena
! Capacity
|-
|  Astana || Astana || Saryarka Velodrome || align=center | 10,000
|-
|  Avtodor Saratov || Saratov || Kristall Ice Sports Palace || align=center | 6,100
|-
|  CSKA Moscow   || Moscow || Universal Sports Hall CSKA || align=center | 5,500
|-
|  Enisey || Krasnoyarsk || Arena Sever || align=center| 4,100
|-
|  Kalev/Cramo || Tallinn || Saku Suurhall Arena || align=center | 7,000
|-
|  Khimki || Khimki || Basketball Center || align=center | 4,000
|-
|  Lokomotiv Kuban || Krasnodar || Basket-Hall || align=center | 7,500
|-
|  Nizhny Novgorod || Nizhny Novgorod || Trade Union Sport Palace || align=center | 5,600
|-
|  Parma || Perm || Universal Sports Palace Molot || align=center | 7,000
|-
|  Tsmoki Minsk || Minsk || Minsk Arena || align=center | 15,000
|-
|  UNICS || Kazan || Basket Hall Arena || align=center | 7,500
|-
|  VEF Rīga || Rīga || Arēna Rīga || align=center | 12,500
|-
|  Zenit Saint Petersburg || Saint Petersburg || Yubileyni Arena || align=center | 7,044
|}

Notes
 Team makes its debut in the VTB United League.
 The defending champions, winners of the 2015–16 VTB United League.

Regular season

Standings

Results

Playoffs

All series were played in a best-of-five play-off series, which were played in a 2-2-1 format. The Playoffs started on May 1 and ended on June 13.

Quarterfinals

Semifinals

Finals

Final standings

All-Star Game

The VTB League's inaugural All-Star Game was held this season on February 11, 2017. The game was played at the Bolshoy Ice Dome in Sochi, Russia. The game was played in a Russia Stars vs. the World Stars format. The Russian Stars won the game against the World Stars, by a score of 131:121. Andrey Vorontsevich was named the MVP of the game. Jānis Timma won the All-Star Game's slam dunk contest, and Sergey Karasev won the 3-Point Contest.

Awards

Season Awards
Scoring Champion
 Nick Minnerath – Avtodor Saratov
Young Player of the Year
 Ivan Ukhov – Parma
Defensive Player of the Year
 Nikita Kurbanov – CSKA Moscow
Sixth Man of the Year
 Suleiman Braimoh – Enisey
Coach of the Year
 Dimitrios Itoudis – CSKA Moscow
Regular Season MVP
 Alexey Shved – Khimki
Playoffs MVP
 Nando de Colo – CSKA Moscow

MVP of the Month

Symbolic 5 of the season
Alexey Shved (Khimki)
Nando de Colo (CSKA Moscow)
Sergey Karasev (Zenit St. Petersburg)
Nick Minnerath (Avtodor)
Frank Elegar (Enisei)

Statistics

Statistical leaders

Source: VTB United League

Individual game highs
Keith Langford set a new all-time scoring record for the VTB United League by scoring 42 points on October 31.

Source: VTB United League

Attendance data 
Attendances include playoff games:

References

External links
Official website

 
2016-17
2016–17 in European basketball leagues
2016–17 in Russian basketball
2016–17 in Latvian basketball
2016–17 in Estonian basketball
2016–17 in Belarusian basketball
2016–17 in Kazakhstani basketball